Dominique Brigitte Picard (born March 3, 1952) is a French mathematician who works as a professor in the Laboratoire de Probabilités et Modèles Aléatoires of Paris Diderot University. Her research concerns the statistical applications of wavelets.

Education
Picard's doctoral advisor was Didier Dacunha-Castelle.

Recognition
She was an invited speaker at the International Congress of Mathematicians in 2006, in the section on probability and statistics. At the congress, she spoke on her work with Gérard Kerkyacharian on "Estimation in inverse problems and second-generation wavelets".

Selected publications
With Valentine Genon-Catalot, Picard is the author of a book on asymptotic theory in statistics, Elements De Statistique Asymptotique (Springer, 1993).

With Wolfgang Härdle, Gerard Kerkyacharian, and Alexander Tsybakov, she is the author of Wavelets, Approximation, and Statistical Applications (Springer, Lecture Notes in Statistics, 1998).

She is also the coauthor of a highly-cited paper in the Journal of the Royal Statistical Society (1995) surveying the wavelet-shrinkage method for nonparametric curve estimation.

References

External links
Home page

1952 births
Living people
French mathematicians
Women mathematicians
French statisticians
Women statisticians